Thomas Gillespie (January 15, 1831 – November 18, 1914) was a member of the Wisconsin State Assembly.

Biography
Gillespie was born on January 15, 1831, in Wigtown, Scotland; sources have differed on the exact location. He married Martha B. Simpson (1836–1920) in 1854, and they had ten children. He died on November 18, 1914, in what was then Kilbourn City, Wisconsin.

Career
Gillespie was a member of the Assembly during the 1880 and 1881 sessions. He was a Republican.

References

External links

Scottish emigrants to the United States
People from Wisconsin Dells, Wisconsin
Republican Party members of the Wisconsin State Assembly
1831 births
1914 deaths
19th-century American politicians